Anoop Pai (born 20 December 1984) is an Indian first-class cricketer who played for Hyderabad.

References

External links
 

1984 births
Living people
Indian cricketers
Hyderabad cricketers
Sportspeople from Addis Ababa